Clythrocerus is a genus of brachyuran crab known from the Gulf of Mexico and western portions of the Atlantic Ocean. It currently includes four species: C. stimpsoni, C. granulatus, C. perpusillus, and C. nitidus.

Cladogram from the Catalogue of Life:

References 

Crabs

Taxonomy (biology)